Dams and reservoirs in China are numerous and have had a profound effect on the country's development and people. According to the World Commission on Dams in 2000, there were 22,104 dams over the height of  operating in China. Of the world's total large dams, China accounts for the most –  of them;  of which are used for irrigation. Accordingly, the oldest in China still in use belongs to the Dujiangyan Irrigation System which dates back to 256 BC. In 2005, there were over 80,000 reservoirs in the country and over 4,800 dams completed or under construction that stands at or exceed  in height. As of 2007, China is also the world's leader in the construction of large dams; followed by Turkey, and Japan in third. Three Gorges is also the world's largest power station.

Dams and their associated reservoirs are constructed by the country for several reasons including hydroelectric power generation, flood control, irrigation, drought mitigation, navigation and tourism. China has the largest potential for hydropower in the world and currently ranks first in hydroelectric generating capacity with about 200,000 MW online. These benefits have come with adverse effects such as resettlement and inundation while impeding river flow often leads to habitat loss and on certain rivers there are issues with trans-boundary river flow.

The nation's leading institution for dam design is the Beijing-based China Institute of Water Resources and Hydropower Research (IWHR), somewhat similar to Russia's Hydroproject Institute.

Below is a partial list of dams and reservoirs in China that are both operational and under construction. The most notable by height, type, and reservoir size, are among those listed.

List

See also
List of power stations in China
List of tallest dams in China
Hydroelectricity in China

References

External links

Chinese National Committee on Large Dams
Map of dams in China – Probe International

 
.01
China